Manfred Binz (22 September 1965) is a German former professional footballer who played as a defender. He is the assistant manager of SC Hessen Dreieich.

Club career
Binz was born in Frankfurt. In his active career the sweeper won the DFB-Pokal with Eintracht Frankfurt. Having made his debut on 2 March 1985, he became the undisputed chief of the Frankfurt defence in the 1986–87 season and appeared in 246 Bundesliga games in a row. Although Frankfurt was always a championship contender at the beginning of the 1990s, Binz failed to win the Bundesliga with the eagles. Finally the national cup victory was the highlight of his active career.

After being eliminated in the UEFA cup in March 1994 he fell out with manager Klaus Toppmöller, causing the slow departure of the sweeper. The situation calmed down but in 1996 he left Eintracht Frankfurt for Italian side Brescia Calcio, playing in Serie B with whom he was immediately promoted to Serie A. In the winter break 1997–98 he returned to the Bundesliga, signing at Borussia Dortmund, slowly fading his pro career and making his Bundesliga appearance on 14 August 1998.

International career
Binz won his first cap after the World Cup 1990 in a friendly match against Portugal. He was part of the Germany national team that finished runners-up at UEFA Euro 1992.

Honours
Eintracht Frankfurt
DFB-Pokal: 1987–88

Germany
 UEFA European Football Championship: runner-up 1992

References

1965 births
Living people
Footballers from Frankfurt
Association football defenders
Association football sweepers
German expatriate footballers
German footballers
Germany international footballers
Germany under-21 international footballers
UEFA Euro 1992 players
Bundesliga players
2. Bundesliga players
Serie A players
Serie B players
Eintracht Frankfurt players
Eintracht Frankfurt II players
Brescia Calcio players
Borussia Dortmund players
Kickers Offenbach players
Kickers Offenbach managers
Expatriate footballers in Italy
German expatriate sportspeople in Italy
German football managers
West German footballers